The Croatia–Slovenia border is the border separating Croatia and Slovenia within the European Union.

Until 2009, litigation over the marine border at the level of the Adriatic Sea undermined relations between the two countries. Slovenia, member of the European Union, posed the resolution of the litigation as condition for the entry of Croatia in Europe.

Land border 

As of January 1, 2023, border controls between Croatia and Slovenia ceased to exist as Croatia joined the Schengen Area. Previously, people crossing the border between Croatia and Slovenia, along with fellow Schengen member Hungary, had to undergo border checks, with Croatia closing its 73 checkpoints at its borders with the two nations. Slovenia had erected a border barrier in response to the 2015 European migrant crisis which is planned to be taken down due to the entry of Croatia into Schengen as well as reports of its ineffectiveness in blocking migration.

Maritime border

See also 
 Croatia–Slovenia relations

References

External links 

 
European Union internal borders
Borders of Croatia
Borders of Slovenia
International borders